Thirteenth Step (stylized as ⊥hiЯteenth $tep or 13th Step) is an American psychedelic rock and post-grunge band, formed in 2006 in Valley Station, Louisville. They were signed to Dirty Water Records until 2009; they were also signed to CITYFIDE MUSIC GROUP from 2013 until 2018. They are currently signed with RFlow Rekordz. The band consists of Michael Anthony King - vocals, guitar; Nicholas Brae King - bass, vocals; Jonathan Barnes - drums, percussion. Thirteenth Step have released two studio albums: No More War and Carry On, as well as six studio EPs.

Thirteenth Step was put in the national spotlight when they were flown to Arlington Heights, Illinois to perform for alternative rock musicians Days of the New at Home Bar Chicago in front of a capacity crowd. That event helped them get endorsements from Gibson Guitars, Ernie Ball Strings and a national distribution deal with Best Buy.

Thirteenth Step tours nationally, having opened up shows for groups including Black Label Society, Suicidal Tendencies, Bad Religion, Black President, Me First and the Gimme Gimmes, NOFX, Filter, We Are the Fallen, Living Sacrifice, Demon Hunter, Dead Kennedys, Social Distortion, Danzig, Eagles of Death Metal, Tenacious D, Mike & The Mechanics, and Days of the New.

13th Step early years (2006–2007)

13th Step was formed by brothers Nicholas and Michael King in the summer of 2006. Nicholas started out as the guitarist and keyboardist, and they performed covers of Christian rock bands like Third Day, MercyMe, and Jars of Clay. They recruited guitarist Brent Evans and drummer Jonathan Barnes as official band members, and bassist Angie Thompson at one point drummer. Chad Walls played duo drummer combo with Jonathan, as seen by The Allman Brothers Band in the 1960s and 70s.

The band recorded four EPs in 2006. Their debut five-song covers release was More Than Words. They wrote four original acoustic songs for Don't Be Afraid. They wrote and recorded four more songs for the release of Hit The Ground. Their self-titled promotional cover CD, used for booking bars and clubs, was released that fall.

The band opened the WLRS Festival in 2006 alongside 7 Day Sun, and SubRosa. In summer 2007 they opened the Christian rock Ichthus Festival. That same summer Thirteenth Step opened for Tantric and Drowning Pool at Phoenix Hill Tavern. The band was known for the sexual-related artwork of porn star Jada Fire as seen on MySpace.

13th Step (2008–09)
Thirteenth Step released a music video featuring Vietnam War footage in July 2008 with their song "My Suicide", and an acid-trip-driven music video for "Don't Be Afraid" the following month on YouTube. The band also released live footage video from concerts and weekly vlogs to update their supporters. 

The band hired Wyndell Williams as a full-time guitarist after Brent Evans was dismissed due to musical differences and drug abuse. The band recorded four albums with Williams but did not break into the mainstream.

Break-up (2008–2014)
After a year's inactivity, 13th Step announced in October 2009 that it had disbanded. Nicholas cited tensions between Michael and the rest of the band. He said that the relationship with Michael had become so strained that they couldn't be creative together. The reality was that Michael was in Beechmont, Louisville battling his addiction to alcohol and drugs. Almost simultaneously with the announcement, Michael opted for a solo career.

On July 3, 2013, Cityfide Music Group released 13th Step's What Hits!?, and Michael released his debut solo album when we were young in 2013 with Cityfide Records recording artist LIL Aizy.

Meanwhile, Nicholas and Jonathan had reunited with Wyndell Williams to form a new band, called Brothers in Arms with singer Chuck Willis, formerly of Breckinridge and the current frontman of Heaven Hill's latest project.

Side projects (2007–2016)

Altered Addiction original line-up and post-breakup legal battles
Altered Addiction was formed in 2008 in Portland, Louisville by vocalist/guitarist Michael King, keyboardist, guitarist, songwriter and producer Steve Mings, guitarist Matt Crowley, bassist Joe Lewis and drummer Jonathan Barnes. In 2008, Altered Addiction signed with Little Heart Records. With the loss of bassist Joe Lewis, Matt Crowley covered both bass and guitar duties on the debut Sweet Dreams - EP. Steve Mings and Michael King of Altered Addiction formed their own imprint record label in the Portland, Louisville area where they had an in-house recording studio and video production company called Addiction Entertainment L.L.C.

Jason Fagan began performing with Michael King and Steve Mings in 2011, under the name "Altered Addiction", until Matt Crowley's estate issued a legal challenge to the use of the trademarked name for a venture not including Crowley. As a result, they changed their name to "Altered Addiction with Jason" in January 2012. The group played at the 2012 Portland Festival embarked on their first tour in 2012, and released their debut album, Vendetta (LP), on November 1, 2012. Fagan left the band on December 22, 2012.

Altered Addiction second line-up
Matt, Steve and Michael regrouped with a new band by the same Altered Addiction in December 2012 with blues guitarist William Mellor (Seth Mellor) to record the covers EP Brown Sugar, released exclusively to ReverbNation. Their original EP Here I Am was released exclusively on PureVolume. Mellor left the band the following year and Dujan Burton was hired to record on the covers EP Change The World. He also wrote the songs "Jug Band" and "Hard Headed", which are now unreleased singles and out of print.

Post-Steve Mings era, session musicians and arrests
Steve Mings was fired in December 2013 after an argument with the band that resulted in Joe P. Kelly and Dwight Cummins becoming his replacements, thus leaving only Mike and Matt as the founding members of the group. Dujan Burton remained in the band and recorded a new album with the group entitled Glances. His departure came after his legal battles and drug habits got in the way of his performance. He was arrested three times in 2015, on August 11, on September 9, and on October 29. This led to his dismissal from the group.

In the following months, Dwight Cummins was arrested for charges of identity theft.

Joe P. Kelly was later fired due to musical differences with Mike and Matt.

Matt and Mike parted ways for a short time.

Jeffrey Hughes era
While Michael and Colin Price, the bassist for Incarnational Sonship, was attending Alcoholics Anonymous meetings in South Louisville, he met guitarist and visual artist Jeffrey Hughes, and asked if he would join him and Matt in Altered Addiction. Later Jesse Brennan and his wife Mindy were asked to join the band, and they recorded the album Sinking Ships within a month of joining the band. This didn't last long due in part to the album's failure in the charts. (It was later discovered that Jesse and Mindy had nothing to do with the writing and recording of Sinking Ships. They had, in fact, been kicked out of the band.)

Dave Eged and Patrick Lee Douglas era

Patrick Lee Douglas asked if Matt and Mike would jam at his place. The acoustic covers EP was recorded in his home that night. He added bass lines to the recordings. within a month, Michael Glenn King, Mike's father, suggested bringing Dave Eged into the band to change up the sound and make something fresh with their music. Being friends from back home in Campbellsburg, Kentucky during the original Thirteenth Step days he agreed. He now resides in Cleveland, Ohio but comes to Louisville to record and practice on a regular basis.

The band recorded the Up Left Mofo demo tape in Patrick's home studio, and their debut studio EP Fallen at American Recording Company in Louisville. A second EP was recorded during these sessions also that only included Dave, Mike and Matt; it featured covers selected from their favorite rock bands, and was entitled Breeze.

"Cumbersome" was re-recorded twice, once with the band as a four piece, and then as a three-piece. It had been recorded once under the Steve Mings and Dujan Burton era of the band on the Change the World EP, and on a Thirteenth Step release, thus making it the fourth studio version Michael had cut to date. A live acoustic version had been issued by 13th Step during that time as well. "Simple Man" was recorded twice, in both sessions.

Incarnational Sonship Christian rock spin off to Altered Addiction
Incarnational Sonship was a Christian alternative rock band that formed in 2011 in Hikes Point, Louisville at the Southeast Christian Church. At that time, the band consisted of vocalist Matt Singleton, bassist Michael "Mike Higgins" King, guitarist Steve Mings, and drummer Jerimy Lindsey. The pastor of the church was throwing a Saturday night concert. A band had backed out and he needed a replacement. Matt, Mike, Steve and Jeremy Mehler formed "Pull Me Apart Trenitalia" to perform.

Incarnational Sonship current line-up

Steve and Michael started a new band after not hearing from the original members of the group. Colin Price had met Michael while attending Bridgehaven with his wife and asked him if he'd like to start a band; he agreed. Cory Brandon Arledge became the group's guitarist and was later replaced by keyboardist Blaine Grant, a childhood friend of Steve's. Michael has said the reasoning for letting such a great guitarist go was his criminal history. This line-up has remained in place to date.

They play shows on a regular basis in coffee shops and churches around Kentucky, Indiana, and Ohio. The band was also known as The Morning Freaks. Upon learning the name was already used by another band, they accepted the fate of Incarnational Sonship and Christian rock being the claim in music.

The band issued two singles, "Jesus" and "Single Dreams", on Purevolume.

Fallen Down
Fallen Down was an acoustic rock band from St. Matthews, Kentucky, formed in 2011. It consisted of vocalists and multi-instrumentalists Nicholas King and Danny Roach, and a wide array of session musicians.

Reunion and touring (2014–2016)
From 2008 onward, Nicholas promised that Thirteenth Step would never reform. However, on April 11, 2014, Thirteenth Step's website announced that the band had reunited for a new tour and planned for a new album. According to Nicholas, "We're all very excited to reconnect with our fans and each other after one long Year." He later added that being in Thirteenth Step again was "the last thing [he] expected." Jonathan also stated: "Our career as Thirteenth Step came to a very abrupt and unforeseen ending. After reflecting on some of the greatest personal and professional moments of our lives, we've come to realize that we are still very capable of continuing that career and our friendship on a grander scale than ever before." In an interview with LEO Weekly magazine, Michael elaborated on the reunion, saying, "We never felt like we weren't together. We're not looking at this as a reunion. It's more of a rebirth."

Hiatus and family issues (2016–present)
The band had announced via its Facebook page after its reunion tour that there was not going to be a new album and that the band would be pausing its activities. The hiatus was due in part to bassist Nicholas Brae King having legal issues, and Michael having family issues with their parents' divorce. The tickets for the last few shows were refunded for those who would rather see Thirteenth Step over Mike's new project with former multi-instrumentalist Steve Mings who he had performed within the bands Never October, Altered Addiction and Incarnational Sonship. They simply dubbed their new project Michael Cash and Steve Mings of Altered Addiction. They had vowed to do remakes acoustically live of Thirteenth Step's hit songs "My Suicide" and "Don't Be Afraid", and fan favorites like "Hit the Ground", "Heaven's Gates", "Misery", and "My Angel".. The duo was set to do a regional headline acoustic tour in the fall of 2016.

Steve and Michael re-released their entire acoustic demo package online, spanning 10 years of over 50 plus acoustic rock originals and covers, 40 or more newly recorded acoustic rock originals and classic folk rock covers, and the unreleased Altered Addiction demo tapes originally recorded under the band name Altered State. The remastered cassette tapes are now offered as free digital downloads. A box set was set to be released on July 4, 2016, containing all three unreleased discs plus the Bad Things EP, Drive EP, Here I Am EP, and Change the World EP, containing unreleased studio sessions and live recordings from their debut tour in 2007 and other unreleased tracks from all four studio sessions.

Side projects (2014–present)

Midtown Cocaine

Michael joined guitarist Charlie and Steve after a jam session at the Urban Goatwalker coffee house to form an acoustic post grunge rock trio entitled Midtown Cocaine. They have released over 50 demo tracks via ReverbNation, mostly rough covers and original songs. The group is an acoustic guitar duo of Steve and Charlie, and singer Michael. They have an early Pearl Jam, Alice In Chains and Soundgarden voice meets Bob Dylan and Neil Young guitar work sound.

Red (Nicholas King solo project)
Nicholas began working as a solo artist again as of July 2016 and plays open mics. He holds a day job and tries to get out and play in his free time. He has released a demos EP on PureVolume.

Shorty Doowop (Jonathan Barnes solo project)

Jonathan Barnes has been recording solo work off and on for over 15 years. He has since returned to recording solo music and touring small clubs and bars. He lives in Phoenix, Arizona and plays nightly gigs all over the city.

In-print record company
Michael King started 13th Step Productions, a production company for underground Louisville area artists that he promotes and manages. He also has started a management company, Michael King Music, Inc. 13th Step Productions has signed Chainfire and most notably Bury The Willing. Michael King Music is the parent company of Burkhart Management L.L.C. The pair produce live recordings and do video production for local area artists, most notably Steve Hunnicutt of Tommyrot.
Michael produced Hunnicutt's acoustic live at Wick's Pizza, which was engineered and recorded by Josh Gray of the band Common Collective.

Discography

Studio albums and EPs

 Money EP
 In the Air Tonight EP
 Hush EP
 Don't Be Afraid EP
 Hit the Ground EP
 No More War
 Carry On

Former members
 Brent Evans - lead guitar, backing vocals, featured on Money EP through Carry On
 Chad Matthew Walls (died October 4, 1974 - January 28, 2015) - drums (Money EP, In The Air Tonight EP, and Hush EP)
 Angela Thompson - bass guitar, backing vocals  (Money EP, In the Air Tonight EP, and Hush EP)
 Chris Walls - drums (Money EP, In the Air Tonight EP, and Hush EP)

Touring musicians

 Shawn Harrell - drums (2009)
 Drew Norris - lead guitar (early 2015)
 Michael Dickerson - lead guitar (2016)
 John Carter - drums (2009)

Session musicians

 Chico Beat - drums and percussion (Cocaine EP)
 Wyndell Williams - lead guitar (Carry On and Christmas EP)

References

Christian rock groups from Kentucky
Musical groups from Louisville, Kentucky
Musical groups established in 2003
2003 establishments in Kentucky